The 2004 MAC men's basketball tournament, a part of the 2003-04 NCAA Division I men's basketball season, took place from March 8–13 at Gund Arena in Cleveland.  Its winner received the Mid-American Conference's automatic bid to the 2004 NCAA tournament. It was a single-elimination tournament with four rounds, and the three highest seeds received byes in the first round. All MAC teams were invited to participate. Western Michigan, the MAC regular season winner, received the number one seed in the tournament. Western Michigan defeated Kent State in the final. In the NCAA they lost in the first round to Vanderbilt.

Tournament

Seeds 
 Western Michigan
 Kent State
 Miami
 Toledo
 Buffalo
 Ball State
 Bowling Green
 Marshall
 Eastern Michigan
 Ohio
 Akron
 Northern Illinois
 Central Michigan

Bracket

First round

Quarterfinals

Semi-finals

Finals

All-Tournament Team
Tournament MVP – 	Mike Williams, Western Michigan

References 

Basketball in Cleveland
Tournament
MAC men's basketball tournament
MAC men's basketball tournament
Mid-American Conference men's basketball tournament